Luzula canariensis is a plant species in the genus Luzula, family Juncaceae. It is endemic to the Canary Islands off the northwest coast of Africa.

References

canariensis
Endemic flora of the Canary Islands
Plants described in 1813